Jeroen van Veen (born May  1969 in Herwen en Aerdt, Gelderland) is a Dutch classical pianist and composer.
As well as undertaking work as a soloist, he collaborates with other pianists. For example, he has formed duos with his brother Maarten, and, later, with his wife Sandra.

Short biography
Jeroen Van Veen studied at the Utrechts Conservatorium (HKU) with Alwin Bär and Håkon Austbø. Since year 1988 he has played concerts and recitals throughout Europe and North America and recorded over 190 CDs for Mirasound, Koch, Naxos, Brilliant Classics and his own label piano. Van Veen's compositions are mostly solo piano works and could be described as mostly minimal music. His latest recordings have also focused on minimal music, including a 9 CD Minimal Piano Collection box set, somewhat dominated by the music of Philip Glass, the complete piano music of George Crumb, and a collaboration on recording all of Steve Reich's Chamber music.

Among other functions, Van Veen is the director of Van Veen Productions , Piano Mania , and the Simeon ten Holt Foundation . He is also the artistic director of the Murray Dranoff Two Piano Competition , based in Miami, where he and his brother Marten van Veen were prize winners in 1995. In 2016 Van Veen received the NPO Radio 4 award; Van Veen was praised for his 'out of the box' programming and for finding new ways to attract a new audience for classical music.

Extended biography

"Dutch pianist and composer Jeroen van Veen, the leading exponent of minimalism in Holland today, Alan Swanson (Fanfare)"

Jeroen Van Veen started playing the piano at the age of 7. He studied at the Utrechts Conservatorium with Alwin Bär and Håkon Austbö. In 1993 he passed the Performing Artists' Exam. Van Veen has played with orchestras conducted by Howard Williams (Adams), Péter Eötvös (Zimmermann) in Amsterdam, Utrecht, Vienna, and Budapest and the United States with Neal Stulberg (Mozart & Bartók) and Robert Craft (Stravinsky) He has played recitals in Austria, Belgium, Canada, England, France, Germany, Hungary, Italy, Russia & the USA.

Van Veen attended master classes with Claude Helffer, Hans-Peter & Volker Stenzl, and Roberto Szidon. He was invited to several festivals, a.o. the Reder Piano Festival (1988), Festival der Kunsten in Bad Gleichenberg (1992), Wien Modern (1993), Holland Dance Festival (1998) Lek Art Festival (1996–2007). Van Veen recorded for major Dutch Radio- and Television companies like AVRO, NOS, IKON, NCRV, TROS/Internet, WTBC-TV & Radio (Florida, U.S.A.), and Moscow Television. In 1992, Van Veen recorded his first CD with his brother Maarten as the internationally recognized Piano duo Van Veen. In 1995 Piano duo Van Veen made their debut in the United States. They were prizewinners in the prestigious 4th International Murray Dranoff Two Piano Competition in Miami, Florida. After this achievement, they toured the United States and Canada many times. The documentary Two Pianos One Passion (nominated for an Emmy Award in 1996) documents them as a duo.

Besides performing, Jeroen is co-founder and artistic director of the International Student Piano Competition, which is held in Utrecht every two years. In 1995 Jeroen Van Veen founded Van Veen & Van Veen (Van Veen & Co.), a piano duo with Sandra Van Veen. As such, they mainly perform music for multiple pianos by the Dutch composer Simeon ten Holt. Furthermore, in 1999 Van Veen initiated a concert series Pianova in the Concertgebouw, Amsterdam. Besides his career as a solo pianist, Van Veen also participates in the following ensembles:  Piano Ensemble, The International Piano Quartet, The Simeon Quartet, Piano Mania, DJ Piano, and Jeroen van Veen & Friends.

The various compositions by Van Veen could be described as Minimal Music with different faces, and crossovers of jazz, blues, soundscape, Avant-garde, techno, trance, and pop music. Currently, Van Veen is director of Van Veen Productions, Chairman of the Simeon ten Holt Foundation, Culemborg Cultural Foundation, Pianomania Foundation, and artistic director of several music festivals in Culemborg, Utrecht and Veldhoven. He is active in the International Utrecht Student Piano Competition and the Murray Dranoff Two Piano Competition. Over the last 25 years, Van Veen recorded more than 200 CDs for several labels (Mirasound, Koch, Naxos, Brilliant Classics) and his label PIANO.

The piano playing in Stravinsky's Les Noces surpassed that of the distinguished musicians in the composer's recording according to The New York Times.
The recording of Erik Satie's music for piano four hands with Sandra van Veen was rated on Classics Today with 10 out of 10 for artistic quality and 10 out of 10 for sound quality and said it to be "...a must for Satie fans."

Discography

Produced at Van Veen Productions Label PIANO

List of works
 Culemborg City Soundscape, (2002) (on CD)
 Weeshuis Soundscape (2005) (on tape)
 Words on Kindness, for 2 pianos and 5 voices (2006) (premiered 2006)
 12 Minimal Preludes, BOOK I, (1999–2003) (on CD 8551) for piano
 12 Minimal Preludes, BOOK II, (2004–2006) (on CD 8551) for piano
 In de Doelen, leadermuziek (2006) on DVD
 Tango for Amalia, Alexia & Ariane (2007) (premiered 2007) for Piano four hands
 Incanto nr 1 for two pianos (2011) on CD
 Snake it easy for 6 pianos
 Draughts for multiple pianos
 "Novosibirsk Chamber Orchestra, A. Polishchuk with Jeroen van Veen (A piano quintet composition of Antonín Dvořák, arranged for piano and String Orchestra)
 Pianomania, piano improvisations on 3 pianos.
 "Minimal Preludes, Book III & Book IV" (2007–2013)
 "NLXL" 2011
"Incanto" II, III & IV
 "Slash" for Itzik Galili

Other official functions 

Van Veen Productions, (1995-) director
International Students Piano Competition, Utrecht (1994-) artistic director
Lek Art Foundation, Culemborg (1994–2007) artistic director
Simeon ten Holt Foundation, Culemborg (2004-) chair
Culemborg Cultureel, Culemborg (2005–2007) chair
Ostinato Festival, Veldhoven (2006-) artistic director
Piano Mania Foundation, Culemborg (2006-) chair
Dranoff Two Piano Foundation Miami, Artistic Director development (2002-)

External links
Website of Jeroen van Veen
Van Veen Productions website

References

1969 births
Living people
People from Rijnwaarden
Dutch classical pianists
Classical piano duos
Minimalist composers
21st-century classical pianists